The Burgess House is a building in Colorado Springs, Colorado which was built in 1888 by Charles H. Burgess, and is one of the few remaining buildings from the first wave of Colorado Springs development. The house is a Pattern house and was listed on the National Register of Historic Places in 1990. The building is of Queen Anne style.

Building 
The house was constructed in 1888 in Colorado Springs, Colorado .

See also
National Register of Historic Places listings in El Paso County, Colorado

References 

Houses on the National Register of Historic Places in Colorado
Houses in El Paso County, Colorado
National Register of Historic Places in Colorado Springs, Colorado
Houses completed in 1888
1888 establishments in Colorado
Kit houses